Terrifier 2 is a 2022 American slasher film written, directed, edited, and produced by Damien Leone. It is a sequel to Terrifier (2016), and is the third feature-length film to feature Art the Clown. It features the return of David Howard Thornton and Samantha Scaffidi, who respectively portrayed Art the Clown and Victoria Heyes in the first film, and stars Lauren LaVera, Elliott Fullam, Sarah Voigt, Kailey Hyman, and Casey Hartnett. The story follows Art's resurrection and pursuit of Sienna Shaw (LaVera) and her younger brother Jonathan (Fullam) on Halloween night — a year after the events of the first film. 

The film originates from a feature film concept Leone began developing shortly after filming his directorial debut short film The 9th Circle (2009). The concept of the planned film focused heavily on an angel-dressed heroine and ultimately fell apart. After the release of Terrifier (2016), Leone wanted to bring the heroine back as the protagonist—she would evolve into Sienna, someone Leone describes as the "heart and soul" of Terrifier 2. Leone spent three months writing a character-driven screenplay following criticism of the first film's perceived lack of narrative.

Funding for the film was exacting as the script was more ambitious than the first film and required a bigger budget. Leone secured finances from private investors before filming, and he launched an Indiegogo campaign with a $50k goal to film a practical effects-driven scene. The campaign was a massive success, reaching over 430% of the initial goal with a total of $250k in donations. It is one of the numerous films impacted by the worldwide COVID-19 pandemic with principal photography coming to a halt mid-2020 due to the pandemic lockdowns. 

The film had its world premiere at the FrightFest on August 29, 2022, and was theatrically released in the United States on October 6, 2022, becoming a hit at the box office, grossing $15 million. The film received generally positive reviews from critics, with particular praise for LaVera and Thornton's performances, though the film's runtime received some criticism. Many critics considered the film to be an improvement over its predecessor. A third film is in development.

Plot
After being resurrected by an unknown entity following the Miles County Massacre, Art the Clown brutally murders the coroner investigating his body with a hammer. He goes to the laundromat to clean his blood-soaked garments, where he encounters The Little Pale Girl—a mysterious sinister entity in similar clown attire. A lone patron sees Art interacting with the girl, who is invisible to him, before being killed. 

A year later, teenager Sienna Shaw puts the finishing touches on her Halloween costume: an angel-warrior that was designed for her by her father, who recently passed away after a brain tumor. Sienna's brother Jonathan wants to dress as Art for Halloween and has become fixated on him since discovering sketches of him and his victims from the Miles County Massacre in their father's sketchbook. That night, Sienna has a nightmare where she encounters Art, and awakens to a fire on her dresser, while a sword that was a gift to her from her father remains unscathed.

On Halloween, Jonathan sees Art and The Little Pale Girl at school playing with a dead opossum, while Sienna has a panic attack when her friends Allie and Brooke discuss Victoria Heyes's meltdown and mutilation of controversial talk show host Monica Brown. Sienna and Allie go to the costume shop to buy a replacement pair of wings, where they encounter Art. Art kills the shop vendor and later breaks into Allie's home, where he theatrically mutilates her — slicing her eye, scalping her, flaying her back, breaking off one of her arms while tearing apart the other, and pouring bleach and salt on her wounds before ripping off half her face. Allie’s mother is killed when she discovers her daughter’s still-living body.

Jonathan shows Sienna and their mother, Barbara, his father's sketchbook of Art, filled with newspaper clippings of killings connected to him, revealing that The Little Pale Girl was his first victim named Emily Crane, the daughter of circus performers whose body was discovered in a makeup trailer. Jonathan believes their father knew how to stop Art, but they do not believe him. After Barbara tears up the sketchbook and hits Jonathan, he runs away. Barbara then finds her car vandalized and while cleaning it she is killed by Art. When Jonathan returns home, he finds his mother's corpse and Art chases after him before drugging and kidnapping him, stealing Sienna's sword in the process.

At a Halloween party, Brooke spikes Sienna's drink with MDMA in an attempt to calm her, but she has a panic attack when she sees The Little Pale Girl. Brooke and her boyfriend Jeff drive Sienna home, but the Little Pale Girl impersonates Jonathan over the phone and lures Sienna to The Terrifier haunted attraction at a defunct carnival where Art killed her years before. Art castrates and kills Jeff and chases Brooke into the haunted attraction before throwing acid on her face, bludgeoning her to death and eating her heart. Sienna discovers Brooke's corpse and fights Art until he knocks her unconscious. She awakens to find Art using a cat o' nine tails on her brother, overpowers Art and begins attacking him with his own weapons. After Art is killed several times by Sienna and Jonathan, he continuously manages to resurrect. He kills Sienna with her father's sword and throws her into a water torture cell. As Art attempts to eat Jonathan, Sienna is mysteriously resurrected by the sword before she decapitates Art, and rescues Jonathan. The Little Pale Girl takes Art's head and leaves without attacking Sienna and Jonathan. 

In a mid-credits scene, an institutionalized Victoria is throwing up before writing "Vicky + Art" and obscenities on the wall with her blood. She gives birth to Art's living head, leaving the horrified nurse screaming.

Cast
 Lauren LaVera as Sienna Shaw, Jonathan's older sister
 Elliott Fullam as Jonathan Shaw, Sienna's younger brother
 Sarah Voigt as Barbara Shaw, mother of Sienna and Jonathan
 Amelie McLain as The Little Pale Girl / Emily Crane
 Chris Jericho as Burke, a nurse
 David Howard Thornton as Art the Clown 
 Kailey Hyman as Brooke, Sienna's friend
 Casey Hartnett as Allie, Sienna's friend 
 Charlie McElveen as Jeff, Brooke's boyfriend
 Johnnath Davis as Ricky, the costume shop clerk
 Amy Russ as Allie's Mother
 Cory DuVal as Coroner 
 Leah Voysey as the Clown Cafe TV host, and a nurse
 Samantha Scaffidi as Victoria "Vicky" Heyes, the sole survivor of the events of the first film, who is now in a psychiatric hospital

Additionally, Griffin Santopietro appears as Eric, Owen Myre appears as Sean, Felissa Rose appears as Ms. Principe, Tamara Glynn appears as Shopping Mother, and Nedim Jahić as Travis Bryant.

Production

Writing

Leone revealed February 12, 2019, in a post on his social media showing the cover page, that the first draft of the screenplay was complete. Leone envisioned the concept of the film dating back to 2008—with an idea of an angel-warrior costumed heroine battling the Art the Clown character. This heroine was the basis of Sienna, who Leone wanted to bring back as the protagonist of Terrifier 2, which he knew he wanted to make while filming the first film. The writing process for the film differed from Leone's previous film projects, in which he had to work around part-time jobs. Leone spent three consecutive months writing. Much of his focus was on developing a protagonist that could rival Art in popularity. When he was not writing, he would read books about screenwriting and listen to screenwriters discuss their processes with writing. 

He opted to bring back the angel-attired heroine a decade later and adapt her into Sienna Shaw. Leone described much of the screenplay revolving around the teenage girl, his favorite character he has ever written. Leone describes the screenplay as much bigger in scope than the previous film and recollects not considering a budget while writing.

One of the factors during writing was establishing an adversary to Art—something inspired by the relationship between superhero Batman and supervillain Joker. During a lunch with Leone and David Howard Thornton, the actress who plays Sienna, Lauren LaVera, was told of this intended dynamic between her character and Art. Besides Sienna, LaVera recollects the script focusing heavily on Sienna's younger brother Jonathan, their mother, and her friends—all of whom play a crucial part in the story.

Casting

Both Thornton and Scaffidi were confirmed to reprise their respective roles of Art and Victoria, becoming the only returning cast members of the prior film, other than a brief voice cameo by Michael Leavy (who played Will the Exterminator in the original film) as the Club Announcer and DJ voice, and Corey Duval, who returns as the coroner from the first movie. There were also reports of Steven Della Salla and Jason Leavy, the two cops in the original film, returning in cameo appearances as well; the three are all producers on the second installment. On September 11, 2019 it was announced that actress Lauren LaVera was cast in the lead role of Sienna Shaw. On October 15, it was announced that Felissa Rose, Chris Jericho and Tamara Glynn had joined the cast in cameo roles. Actress Leah Voysey had auditioned for Sienna and her friends Ally and Brooke before co-producer Jason Leavy, who knew about Voysey's singing and guitar skills, invited her to be the host that performed a song in the Clown Cafe dream sequence, which after being filmed led to Leone bringing Voysey to appear as a nurse in the credits scene.

Filming
While Leone had secured full funding for the film from a handful of private investors prior to filming, he launched an Indiegogo with a $50k goal to finance a practical effects driven scene and to attach a well known actor to the project. The campaign was a major success, grossing over $125k in the first week. It reached a total of $250k by the end of the campaign, 430% more than the initial goal.

Filming began in October 2019. While a majority of the film's main story line had already been completed, principal photography was halted due to COVID-19, becoming one of many films affected by the worldwide COVID-19 pandemic. On September 7, Leone revealed that he was in the process of working on the prosthetic makeup for Victoria's disfigured face in preparation of filming Samantha Scaffidi's scenes. As Sienna's costume received a positive reception when production stills were officially released, when asked about the attire, LaVera described liking it on the first day of wearing it but began to feel disdain for it throughout the course of filming as it was uncomfortable to wear. She even obtained blisters from wearing it. Filming quietly resumed and wrapped on July 10, 2021. The post-credits scene would originally reveal Art growing out of the back of Victoria's head, but once Malignant had a similar getup for its villain, Leone discarded it and shot another sequence where Victoria gave birth to Art's head.

Marketing 
A teaser trailer for Terrifier 2 was released on July 24, 2020. MovieWeb's Jeremy Dick commented on the teaser, stating that "the teaser is pretty exciting to watch for anyone who enjoyed the first movie." Matt Joseph of We Got This Covered also reviewed the trailer, writing "This trailer, though brief, does at least promise a bigger, bloodier and more terrifying sequel, one that should have no issue pleasing those who found much to like in the original."

It was also announced that a three issue limited release comic book series would be issued prior to the film's release.

Special effects

The film has gained significant media coverage because of the gore effects, particularly for the infamous "Bedroom Scene," depicting the lengthy murder of the supporting character Allie (Casey Hartnett). Leone has stated it was the most challenging and technical scene to film out of the entire production—three minutes depicting mutilation. Leone had to create a life-size replica puppet of Hartnett that could work as an animatronic. He stated, "I had people under the bed with rods going through it into her limbs and behind the wall operating her head. I put some rubber gloves in her chest with tubing to have her breathe." Leone digitally added Hartnett's eye onto the puppet when Allie awakens to her mother.

Release 
Terrifier 2 had its world premiere at the Fantastic Fest on August 29, 2022, and was shown on the same day at Fright Fest in London. It was theatrically released on October 6, 2022 by Bloody Disgusting. The film is intended to later stream on Screambox, as well as play at various "prominent genre festivals" prior to its official release. Leone had previously expressed a desire to release the movie "road show style" once it is finished.

While it was originally only set for a one-week limited theatrical release, audience demand lead Bloody Disgusting to announce that Terrifier 2 would remain in theaters for a second weekend on October 12, 2022. On October 17, this run was extended for another week.

The film was released for VOD on November 11, 2022, with a Blu-ray and DVD release on December 27, 2022.

Reception

Box office
Terrifier 2 was released in 886 theaters in the United States, grossing $400,000 on its opening day. It went on to debut to $805,000, and then made $1 million the following weekend (an increase of 28%). Variety called the film's success a "shock" to the industry due to its low budget and limited mainstream marketing. Through its first two weeks of release, the film had grossed $3.4 million. Expanding to 1,550 theaters in its fourth weekend (an increase of 795) the film made $1.8 million, for a running total of $10.1 million as of November 2022.

Speaking of the film's box office success, Leone said "I did not expect it to make this kind of splash or play in theaters, honestly, other than maybe a few arthouse theaters. To see it snowballing, the word of mouth growing, people getting sick and fainting and it really taking off, I never expected this or for it to make millions of dollars in theaters."

Critical response
On Rotten Tomatoes, the film holds an approval rating of 85% based on 74 reviews, with an average rating of 6.7/10. The website's critical consensus reads: "Terrifier 2 outdoes the original in every way -- which makes it bad news for the squeamish, but a bloody good time for genre enthusiasts." On Metacritic it has a weighted average score of 59 out of 100 based on eight critics, indicating "mixed or average reviews".

Jeffrey Anderson of Common Sense Media described the characters as memorable, particularly Sienna, due to her character development. Anderson states that "human life starts to matter more here than it did in the first film." Matt Donato of IGN while stating the film has "underdeveloped subplots and themes" noted it as an improvement of the original film and highlighted the performance of LaVera, writing that she "rules as Sienna in her angel-winged fantasy armor as a final girl fighting for family, facing her demons, and screaming bloody war cries in Art's mocking face." Matthew Jackson of Paste wrote that "LaVera, tasked with injecting humanity into the sequel, lives up to this task with pure star power." Trace Sauveur of The Austin Chronicle praised the "sense of physicality and comic timing" of Thornton. Sammy Gecsoyler from The Guardian rated the film a total of three stars out of five, praising the film's creative kills, and performances, while giving some criticism towards its runtime.

The film was not without its detractors. Owen Gleiberman of Variety commended the film for effectively capturing the look and feel of 1970's and 1980's slasher films, as well as the soundtrack and special effects, but was critical of the relentless brutality and unsympathetic characters. Adam Graham of The Detroit News rated the film a grade D, calling it "[a] bludgeoning exercise in splatter, which drags on well past the two hour mark with no sense of purpose other than its own inert attempts to shock."

Audience response
Following its release, there were several reports of viewers vomiting and fainting during their screenings of Terrifier 2, with one instance allegedly having emergency services being called. Speaking on the audience reactions to the film, director Damien Leone remarked "Listen, I would have loved to have a couple of walk-outs, I think that's sort of a badge of honor because it is an intense movie. I don't want people fainting, getting hurt during the movie. But it's surreal."

Sequel
Both Leone and Thornton have stated that a Terrifier 3 is planned, along with further installments that will slowly build on Art's background and motives. In October 2022, Leone said he had an entire treatment for a third film but it "is getting so big that it could potentially split into a Part 4 because [he] wouldn't want to make another 2 hour 20 minute movie."

References

External links
 Official Website

 

2022 horror films
2020s black comedy films
2020s slasher films
2020s monster movies
Horror films about clowns
2022 films
2022 independent films
American black comedy films
American slasher films
American splatter films
Films shot in New York (state)
2020s English-language films
Films directed by Damien Leone
Films impacted by the COVID-19 pandemic
Film spin-offs
2020s American films
Films set in 2018